Joseph Gerard Hanefeldt (born April 25, 1958) is an American prelate of the Roman Catholic Church.  He has been serving as bishop of the Diocese of Grand Island in the state of Nebraska since 2015.

Early life and education
Joseph Hanefeldt was born on April 25, 1958, in Creighton, Nebraska.  He  began his studies for the priesthood at  St. John Vianney College Seminary at the University of St. Thomas in St. Paul, Minnesota.  He did his theological studies at the Pontifical Gregorian University and studied sacramental theology at the Pontifical Atheneum of St. Anselm both in Rome, Italy.

Priesthood
Hanefeldt was ordained in Rome by Archbishop Jean Jadot a priest for the Archdiocese of Omaha on July 14, 1984. After his ordination Hanefeldt served as a curate at St. Mary's Parish in West Point, Nebraska from 1984 to 1988, and St. Joan of Arc Parish in Omaha from 1988 to 1992.  Concurrent with his parish assignments Hanefeldt served as director of the diocesan Pro-Life Office from 1991 to 2005.  Hanefeldt became the pastor of St. Joseph Parish in Omaha in 1992 and served there until 1995.  At the same time, he served as the moderator of the Diocesan Council of Catholic Women.  He then became pastor of St. Elizabeth Seton Parish in Omaha in 1995 and served in that position until 2007.

From 2007 to 2012, Hanefeldt served on the staff of the Pontifical North American College in Rome.  For the first two years, Hanefeldt was a spiritual director and from 2009 to 2012 he was the director of the spiritual formation program.  Pope Benedict XVI named him a chaplain of his holiness, with the title monsignor, in December 2010.  He returned to Omaha in 2012 and served as pastor of Christ the King Parish until 2015.

Bishop of Grand Island
Hanefeldt was named the eighth bishop of the Diocese of Grand Island by Pope Francis on January 14, 2015.  His episcopal ordination took place on March 19, 2015, at the Cathedral of the Nativity of the Blessed Virgin Mary in Grand Island, Nebraska.  He was ordained by Archbishop George Lucas of Omaha.  Auxiliary Bishop Lee Piché and Bishop Robert Gruss were the co-consecrators.

See also

 Catholic Church hierarchy
 Catholic Church in the United States
 Historical list of the Catholic bishops of the United States
 List of Catholic bishops of the United States
 Lists of patriarchs, archbishops, and bishops

References

External links

 Roman Catholic Diocese of Grand Island

Episcopal succession

1958 births
Living people
People from Creighton, Nebraska
University of St. Thomas (Minnesota) alumni
Pontifical North American College alumni
Pontifical Gregorian University alumni
21st-century Roman Catholic bishops in the United States
Roman Catholic Archdiocese of Omaha
Roman Catholic bishops of Grand Island
Clergy from Omaha, Nebraska
Catholics from Nebraska
Bishops appointed by Pope Francis